Garner is an unincorporated community on Farm Road 113 northwest of Weatherford in Parker County, Texas, United States. It has a population of around 100.

History
The original settlement in the area was called Trappe Springs and was founded in the 1850s by a small group of families. The current town was settled in the 1880s half a mile west of the original site, and named Garner after a local gin operator. For most of the 20th century, the town has  had steady growth, from around 40 residents in 1914 to 98 in 1990. A post office was located in Garner from around 1890 to 1970.

The town has a Baptist church, an elementary/middle school, and several small businesses.
Much of the surrounding land is used for livestock farming.

The post office and general store in Garner were run for many years by a Mr. James A. Vance. A story about him is in a book by Ben K. Green, Wild Cow Tales. The story is called "The One That Got Away". Mr. Vance was born June 14, 1871, arrived in Garner on Oct. 7, 1894, and died at home in Garner in 1964.

Two residents of the town are credited with invention of the regional domino game "42" in 1887.

References

Minor, D. (2001). Garner, Texas. Handbook of Texas Online. Retrieved August 2, 2006.

External links
 

Unincorporated communities in Parker County, Texas
Unincorporated communities in Texas
Dallas–Fort Worth metroplex